Harald Andreas Rød (29 July 1907 – 14 August 1982) was a Norwegian farmer and politician for the Centre Party.

He was born in Frogn as a son of farmers, and became a farmer at Huseby near Drøbak. In 1945 he became the first chairman of Norges Bygdeungdomslag. He also served as mayor of Frogn from 1946 to 1961. As such he was also a member of the county council.

He died in August 1982.

References

1907 births
1982 deaths
People from Frogn
Norwegian farmers
Mayors of places in Akershus
Centre Party (Norway) politicians